Stichophthalma godfreyi is a butterfly of the family Nymphalidae. It is found in scattered areas in South-East Asia, including Burma and Thailand.

The wingspan is 90–180 mm.

References

Amathusiini
Butterflies of Indochina